Sir Benjamin Robertson, KCSI, KCMG, CIE (16 October 1864 – 14 April 1953) was an administrator in British India. He was Chief Commissioner of the Central Provinces from 1912 to 1920.

References 

Indian Civil Service (British India) officers
1864 births
1953 deaths
Place of birth missing